2022 was the 62nd edition of the Swedish music competition Melodifestivalen, which was organised by  (SVT) and took place over a six-week period between 5 February and 12 March 2022. The winner of the competition was Cornelia Jakobs with the song "Hold Me Closer", who represented  in the Eurovision Song Contest 2022, where she came fourth with 438 points. All shows were hosted by Oscar Zia.

Format 

The event was planned to return to its traditional tour around six cities of the country (namely Malmö, Gothenburg, Linköping, Lidköping, Örnsköldsvik and Stockholm) with venues available for spectators, after the previous edition was entirely held in one place and without an audience due to the COVID-19 pandemic. However, due to tightening restrictions in light of the spread of the Omicron variant, SVT announced on 14 January 2022 that all shows would instead be held in Stockholm. On 4 February, SVT announced that the first three heats would be held in the Avicii Arena, while the remaining one heat, the semi-finals and the final would be held in the Friends Arena.

As usual, a total of 28 entries took part in the competition, 12 of which made it to the final. For this edition, the wildcard spot given to one of the artists in the P4 Nästa competition organised by Sveriges Radio P4 was not used.

Proceeds from the voting in the fourth heat, semi-finals and final were donated to aid relief efforts during the 2022 Russian invasion of Ukraine.

Format changes 

New changes to the format were announced on 26 January 2022.

Heats 
Two rounds of voting take place. The song with the most votes in the first round directly qualifies for the final, while in the second round, the remaining six songs are decided on largely as it was prior – the top-placed song qualify for the final, while the songs that placed second and third go to the semi-finals, using a system of age groups that has been in place since 2019. Each age group's vote carries a score of 12, 10, 8, 5, 3 and 1. For the first time, the full breakdown of the results, including points given out by each age group, is shown on screen. In contrast to previous editions, the two finalists do not reprise their songs at the end of the broadcast.

Semi-finals 
The semi-finals show was introduced to replace the previously-held Second Chance round. In a draw held on 1 March 2022, the third- and fourth-placed songs from each of the previous four heats (eight songs in total) are placed into two semi-finals. No differences are made on whether the entries placed third or fourth in their respective heats. The top two songs from each semi-final proceed to the final, using the age group system. Each age group's vote carries a score of 12, 10, 8, and 5. For the semi-finals, no full results breakdown is shown on screen.

Final 
After the international jury groups have cast their votes, all viewers are provided with new votes, in order to continue to influence the results even after the international jury has had its say. The public voting results are determined using the age group system. Each age group's vote carries a score of 12, 10, 8–1.

Presenters 

Radio and television host Farah Abadi served as the artists' interviewer along the course of the competition and co-hosted the final. For the final, a commentary in English was provided by Olivia Le Poidevin and Bella Qvist on a separate stream on SVT Play.

Competing entries 
On 27 August 2021, SVT opened a public submission window (with the deadline on 17 September 2021) to select one half of the contestants, the other half being made up of artists specially invited by the broadcaster. Upon closing the submission period, SVT announced that over 2,500 applications had been received, to be reviewed by a professional jury chaired by producer Karin Gunnarson.

The first half of contestants were officially announced by SVT on 26 November 2021, while the second half was revealed on the following 1 December. Several participants had previously competed at : Cornelia Jakobs (2011 and 2012, as part of Love Generation), Alvaro Estrella (2014, 2020 and 2021), Robin Bengtsson (2016, 2020, and winner in 2017), Lisa Ajax (2016, 2017, and 2019), Omar Rudberg (2017, as part of FO&O, and solo in 2019), Liamoo (2018 and 2019), John Lundvik (2018 and winner in 2019), Malou Prytz (2019 and 2020), Anna Bergendahl (2019, 2020, and winner in 2010), Faith Kakembo (2020), Klara Hammarström (2020 and 2021), band Lillasyster (2021), Sami Rekik, member of Medina (2021, with WAHL), Danne Stråhed (1992, as part of Wizex) and veterans Linda Bengtzing (2005, 2006, 2008, 2011, 2014, 2016 and 2020) and Shirley Clamp (2003, 2004, 2005, 2009, 2011 and 2014).

Heats

Heat 1 
The first heat took place on 5 February 2022 in the Avicii Arena, Stockholm. 3,135,000 viewers watched the heat live. A total of 207,996 votes were cast, using 92,275 devices. Due to a technical fault, app voting did not work during this heat and only telephone voting was counted.

Heat 2 
The second heat took place on 12 February 2022 in the Avicii Arena, Stockholm. 2,845,000 viewers watched the heat live. A total of 10,514,804 votes were cast (which is a record for a heat), using 541,541 devices.

Heat 3 
The third heat took place on 19 February 2022 in the Avicii Arena, Stockholm. 2,958,000 viewers watched the heat live. A total of 9,485,644 votes were cast, using 556,791 devices.

Heat 4 
The fourth heat took place on 26 February 2022 in the Friends Arena, Stockholm. This heat was originally going to take place at Avicii Arena, but had to be moved because the arena was already booked for a concert by singer Tomas Ledin. 2,778,000 viewers watched the heat live. A total of 8,423,843 votes were cast, using 534,683 devices.

Semi-finals 
The semi-finals took place as part of one show on 5 March 2022 in the Friends Arena, Stockholm. 2,540,000 viewers watched the show live. A total of 6,415,609 votes were cast, using 584,876 devices.

Semi-final 1

Semi-final 2

Final 
The final took place on 12 March 2022 in the Friends Arena, Stockholm, where Cornelia Jakobs won with her song "Hold Me Closer". 3,289,000 viewers watched the final live. A record-breaking total of 22,447,671 votes were cast, using 1,088,043 devices.

Ratings

References

External links 
 Melodifestivalen Official Site

2022 song contests
Eurovision Song Contest 2022
2022
February 2022 events in Sweden
March 2022 events in Sweden